WNP may refer to:

 Naga Airport (IATA code WNP), Philippines
 Wanstead Park railway station (National Rail station code WNP), London, England
 Welsh Nation Party
 White Nationalist Party
 Wireless number portability
 Westland New Post